Barreiro River or Barreiros River may refer to the following rivers in Brazil:

 Barreiro River (Mato Grosso)
 Barreiro River (Paraná)
 Barreiros River (Mato Grosso do Sul)
 Barreiros River (Tocantins)
 Barreiro de Baixo River